Events from the year 1321 in the Kingdom of Scotland.

Incumbents
Monarch – Robert I

Events
 March/April – peace talks at Bamburgh Castle end without agreement

See also

 Timeline of Scottish history

References

 
Years of the 14th century in Scotland
Wars of Scottish Independence